Shapwick is a village and civil parish in east Dorset, England, situated on the River Stour five miles south-east of Blandford Forum and eight miles north of Poole.  The village had a population of 190 in 2001.

Within the parish, about a mile to the north-east of the village, is the Iron Age hill fort of Badbury Rings.

In Roman times there was a Roman Fort at Crab Farm, between Shapwick and Badbury Rings. Just to the west of the fort was a small Romano-British town, believed to be that listed in the Antonine Itinerary as Vindocladia.

In 1983 Shapwick was used as one of the two real life locations for the Doctor Who story The Awakening.  The other village used was Martin in Hampshire.

One of its most famous residents was Charles Bennett who won the 1500 metres at the 1900 Summer Olympics.

The Shapwick monster

A local legend tells how in the year 1706 a travelling fishmonger was one day passing through the village of Shapwick, when, unbeknownst to the fishmonger, a crab fell off his cart. The fishmonger continued on his journey, but the local villagers, who had never seen a crab before, gathered around the creature poking it with sticks believing it to be a devil or monster. The fishmonger (according to one version of the story) eventually returned looking for his lost crab, and when he saw the commotion, picked up the crab and continued on his way to spread the story about the simple folk of Shapwick.

The story was cemented in verse and pictures in 1841 by the artist Buscall Fox, and today the legend is commemorated on a story board on display at the Anchor Inn, and also in the name of Crab Farm, which has a weathervane showing the crab and villagers.

References

External links

 Census data
 Shapwick - a Dorset village in the 1950s and 1960s

Civil parishes in Dorset
Villages in Dorset